The Dairi mine is one of the largest lead mines in Indonesia. The mine is located in eastern Indonesia in East Kalimantan. The mine has reserves amounting to 26.6 million tonnes of ore grading 7% lead and 12% zinc.

References 

Lead and zinc mines in Indonesia